Poltavsky District is an administrative and municipal district (raion), one of the thirty-two in Omsk Oblast, Russia. It is located in the southwest of the oblast. Its administrative center is the urban locality (a work settlement) of Poltavka. Its 21,772  people (2010 Census) account for 32.3% of the district's total population.

Notable residents 

Yury Belyayev (born 1947), film and theatre actor, Honored Artist of the Russian Federation 
Mariya Dolina (1922–2010), pilot, born in Sharovka

References

Notes

Sources

Districts of Omsk Oblast